Bartkus is the masculine form of a Lithuanian family name. 

Its feminine forms  are: Bartkuvienė (married woman or widow) and Bartkutė (unmarried woman).

The surname may refer to:

Frank Bartkus (1915-1986), a U.S. soccer goalkeeper 
Gintautas Bartkus (b. 1966), Lithuanian lawyer, Justice minister
Ray Bartkus (b. 1961) is a Lithuanian artist
 Bartkus v. Illinois, is a decision of the U.S. Supreme Court, 1959. 

Lithuanian-language surnames